"Away" is a song performed by singer Fatin Shidqia. It is her first single  and featured on her second album which would be released in 2016. This song is her first English-language song and used for Soundtrack her debut film title Dreams. In this song, Fatin says the word "Away" 81 times which is noticeable.

Music videos
The lyric video was released on September 17, 2015 on FatinVevo YouTube account channel The music video was released on October 8, 2015 on FatinVevo YouTube account channel.

Live performances
The track was performed live for the first time on 16 September 2015 at Dahsyat on RCTI. On 28 April 2016, Fatin was performed this song in acoustic version at SCTV Music Awards 2016. Fatin also sing this song on her off air performances.

Track listing
Digital download
 Away (English Version) - 3:11
 Away (Indonesian Version) - 3:11

Awards and nominations

References

External links

2015 singles
2015 songs
Sony Music singles
Songs written by Erik Lidbom